This is a list of tenshu-style buildings outside of Japan. Most of these buildings were constructed by Japanese immigrants in 20th century, and not faithfully reproductions of traditional Japanese castle.

Notes

See also 
List of Japanese castles
List of Japanese castles utilised by foreign troops
List of foreign-style castles in Japan